The Mendel-Ryberg Basin is a Nectarian impact basin on the southwestern limb of the moon.  It is named after the crater Mendel on the west margin and the smaller crater Rydberg north of the center of the basin.  The basin is due south of the larger, younger Orientale basin, and ejecta and other geomorphological effects from the younger basin have overprinted the older one.

At the center is a mass concentration (mascon), or gravitational high.  The mascon was first identified by Doppler tracking of the Lunar Prospector spacecraft.  The existence of the basin was confirmed by the GRAIL spacecraft.

Other craters within the basin include Guthnick, De Roy, Arrhenius, Yakovkin, Graff, Andersson, Chadwick, Fényi, Blanchard, and Baade.  Vallis Baade cuts tangentially across the northeast rim of the basin.  Nearby craters just outside the outer rim include Drude, Chant, Steklov, Lippmann, Petzval, Chappe, Pilâtre, Hausen, Pingré, and Inghirami.  The large crater Bailly is to the southeast, and to the west beyond Lippmann is the South Pole-Aitken Basin.

References

Impact craters on the Moon
LQ28 quadrangle